Dow Medical College is a public medical school located in the city of Karachi, Sindh. It was founded in 1945 and named after British civil servant Sir Hugh Dow, Governor of Sindh.

In 2003, it became a constituent college of the newly formed Dow University of Health Sciences.

History
The Dow Medical College was established in Hyderabad in the 1945. It was relocated to Karachi by Sir Hugh Dow, governor of Sindh. Until 1947, it was an affiliate of University of Bombay. After the independence of India, it was under the University of Sindh. After the University of Karachi was founded, it became its affiliate. It was in 2003 when the Dow University of Health Sciences was established as an independent institution, with Dow Medical College and two other colleges being put under its umbrella.

E-CME Program at Dow University of Health Sciences

DUHS is launching its web-based Continuing Medical Education Program named the "e-CME Program for the Family Physicians".

Social service activities

Notable alumni
Dow Medical college is a large provider of physicians to Pakistan and also to the United States. It is the Pakistan medical school with the greatest amount of licensed physicians in the United States per the 2108 FSMB Survey with 3,232 licensed physicians. Its graduates include:
 Basheer Ahmed - physician and American medical academic
  Dr. Muhammad Mohiuddin - Professor of surgery at University of Maryland School of Medicine & Considered one of the world's foremost experts on transplanting animal organs, known as xenotransplantation.
 Abdul Bari Khan - Cardiologist, philanthropist and CEO of Indus Hospital and Health Network
 Adeebul Hasan Rizvi – Transplant Urologist, philanthropist and head of Sindh Institute of Urology and Transplantation.
 Sanjay Gangwani - Pakistani Politician
 Rafat Hussain – Deputy Head of the School of Rural Medicine at the University of New England, Australia
 Ishrat-ul-Ibad Khan – Governor of Sindh, Pakistan.
 Shabuddin H. Rahimtoola, MBBS, FRCP [Edin], MACP, MACC, D.Sc. (Hon) - Author, Cardiologist at Mayo Clinic best known for his work in valvular heart disease, coronary artery disease, results of cardiac surgery, and arrhythmias along with cardio-myopathy and congenital heart disease.
 Fahad Mirza - Actor and Model
 Azra Raza -  Author, Director of Myelodysplastic Syndrome (MDS) Center at Columbia University
 Javed Iqbal Kazi, Dean of medicine- University of Karachi, Sindh Institute of Urology & Transplantation
 Nausheen Hamid - Pakistani politician and social activist, member of the National Assembly of Pakistan
 Tahir Shamsi - Pakistani  hematologist and bone marrow pioneer
 NAYYAR T. SYED, M.D. - Medical School: Dow Medical College , Karachi, Pakistan Internship: Civil Hospital , Karachi, Pakistan; Department of Psychiatry, University of West Virginia , Charleston, West Virginia Residency: Department of Internal Medicine, University of Oklahoma , Tulsa, Oklahoma Fellowhsip: The University of Texas Medical Branch , Galveston, Texas. American Society of Clinical Oncology ; American Society of Hematology ; American Medical Association .

See also
 Official Website of Dow University of Health Sciences
 DOW Graduates Association of North America (DOGANA)
 DOW Graduates Association of Northern Europe
 DUHS e-CME Programme
 Mohiuddin-Muhammad/Muhammad M. Mohiuddin, MBBS

References

External links
 Dow University of Health Sciences – Official website
 Complete Profile – Business Recorder.com 
 DUHS e-CME Programme
 In a First, Man Receives a Heart From a Genetically Altered Pig

 
Medical colleges in Sindh
Universities and colleges in Karachi
Educational institutions established in 1941
1941 establishments in India